In Theravada Buddhism, anupubbikathā or ānupubbikathā (Pali) – variously translated as "gradual discourse," "gradual instruction," "progressive instruction," and "step-by-step talk" – is a method by which the Buddha taught the Dhamma to suitably receptive lay people.  In this approach, the Four Noble Truths are the consummate teaching. The common formula is:
 Generosity (dāna)
 Virtue (sīla)
 Heaven (sagga)
 Danger of sensual pleasure ( ādīnava)
 Renunciation (nekkhamma)
 The Four Noble Truths (cattāri ariya-saccāni)

From the Pali Canon

In the Pali Canon, the title for this training, its general intent and outline are provided in the following narrative formula (in English and Pali) which is found in multiple discourses:

"Then the Blessed One gave the householder ... progressive instruction, that is, talk on giving, talk on virtue, talk on the heavens; he explained the danger, degradation, and defilement in sensual pleasures and the blessing of renunciation. When he knew that the householder['s] ... mind was ready, receptive, free from hindrances, elated, and confident, he expounded to him the teaching special to the Buddhas: suffering, its origin, its cessation, and the path."

Details for this training are provided in DN 2 and, to a lesser degree, in MN 27 and MN 51.

See also
 Gradual training
 Four Noble Truths
 Noble Eightfold Path
 Dīghajāṇu Sutta (AN 8.54)
 Mangala Sutta (Sn 2.4)
 Samaññaphala Sutta (DN 2)
 Threefold Training
 Buddhist Paths to liberation

Notes

Bibliography
 Bodhi, Bhikkhu (2005). In the Buddha's Words: An Anthology of Discourses from the Pali Canon. Boston: Wisdom Publications. .
 Bullitt, John T. (2005). Dhamma. Retrieved 2007-11-08 from "Access to Insight" at http://www.accesstoinsight.org/ptf/dhamma/index.html.
 La Trobe University (n.d.), "Pali Canon Online Database," online search engine of the Sri Lanka Tripitaka Project's (SLTP) Pali Canon. Retrieved 2007-11-12 at https://web.archive.org/web/20070927001234/http://www.chaf.lib.latrobe.edu.au/dcd/pali.htm.
 , Bhikkhu (trans.) & Bodhi, Bhikkhu (ed.) (2001). The Middle-Length Discourses of the Buddha: A Translation of the Majjhima Nikāya. Boston: Wisdom Publications. .
 Nyanatiloka (1980). Buddhist Dictionary: Manual of Buddhist Terms and Doctrines. Kandy, Sri Lanka: Buddhist Publication Society. . Retrieved 2007-11-10 from "BuddhaSasana" at http://www.budsas.org/ebud/bud-dict/dic_idx.htm.
 Rhys Davids, T.W. & William Stede (eds.) (1921–25). The Pali Text Society’s Pali–English Dictionary. Chipstead: Pali Text Society. A general on-line search engine for the PED is available at http://dsal.uchicago.edu/dictionaries/pali/.
 Thanissaro Bhikkhu (trans.) (1997). Samaññaphala Sutta: The Fruits of the Contemplative Life (DN 2). Retrieved 2007-11-11 from "Access to Insight" at http://www.accesstoinsight.org/tipitaka/dn/dn.02.0.than.html.
 Thanissaro, Bhikkhu (trans.) (1998). Kutthi Sutta: The Leper (Ud. 5.3). Retrieved 2007-11-12 from "Access to Insight" at http://www.accesstoinsight.org/tipitaka/kn/ud/ud.5.03.than.html.
 Walshe, Maurice (1995). The Long Discourses of the Buddha: A Translation of the Dīgha Nikāya. Boston: Wisdom Publications. .

Buddhist education